John Courtis (22 August 1902 – 30 June 1975) was a British boxer who competed in the 1924 Summer Olympics. In 1924 he was eliminated in the quarterfinals of the light heavyweight class after losing his fight to Carlo Saraudi.

References

External links
 John Courtis' profile at the British Olympic Committee
 John Courtis' profile at Sports Reference.com

1902 births
1975 deaths
Light-heavyweight boxers
Olympic boxers of Great Britain
Boxers at the 1924 Summer Olympics
British male boxers